Silken Shackles is a 1926 American silent drama film produced and distributed by Warner Bros. The film was directed by Walter Morosco, the son of theater owner Oliver Morosco, and based on a play by Charles Harris. Irene Rich leads the cast.

Cast
Irene Rich as Denise Lake
Huntley Gordon as Howard Lake
Bertram Marburgh as Lord Fairchild
Victor Varconi as Tade Adrian
Evelyn Selbie as Tade's Mother
Robert Schable as Frederic Stanhope
Kalla Pasha as Tade's Father
Julius Molnar as Child (uncredited)

Preservation
With no prints of Silken Shackles located in any film archives, it is a lost film.

References

External links

 Alternate lobby poster #1, #2(Wayback Machine), #3

1926 films
American silent feature films
American films based on plays
Lost American films
Warner Bros. films
1926 drama films
Silent American drama films
American black-and-white films
1926 lost films
Lost drama films
1920s American films